The Sandra Day O'Connor United States Courthouse is a courthouse at 401 West Washington Street in Phoenix, Arizona.

Description
The building is home to the United States District Court for the District of Arizona, and also hosts Circuit Judges William C. Canby Jr.; Michael Daly Hawkins; Mary H. Murguia; Mary M. Schroeder; Andrew D. Hurwitz; and Barry G. Silverman of the United States Court of Appeals for the Ninth Circuit.

Built at a cost of $123 million and dedicated in October 2000, the building was championed by Senior United States District Judge Robert C. Broomfield. It was designed by architect Richard Meier, with local executive architects of Langdon Wilson Architecture in Phoenix. The building is in Meier's signature monochrome style. The building's public atrium features a six-story glass curtain wall on the north face, and contains a drum-shaped special-proceedings courtroom with a glass-lens ceiling, the work of James Carpenter, an American light artist and designer. There is no public parking.

Climate-control problems
Although part of the General Services Administration's initiative to bring design excellence to public buildings, the building has been plagued with climate-control problems with its evaporative-cooling system. Temperatures in the atrium have been known to reach  in the summer, and the ceiling was open to dust storms, but now motorized louvers prevent infiltration during storms.

See also

 2000 in architecture
 List of United States federal courthouses

References 

 Meier, R. & Frampton, K. & Rykwert, J. & Holl, S. (2004).  Richard Meier Architect. New York City: Rizzoli International Publications, Inc.  Page 174.  .

2000 establishments in Arizona
Buildings and structures in Phoenix, Arizona
Courthouses in Arizona
Federal courthouses in the United States
Government buildings completed in 2000
Richard Meier buildings